The Witty Sorcerer, also known as Zuo ci xi cao, is a 1931 Hong Kong historical comedy-drama film, directed by Lai Pak-hoi. It was released on 14 March 1931 after Lai's other film The Pain of Separation and starred Lai himself and Xu Menghen. It is based on a story in the 14th-century historical novel Romance of the Three Kingdoms about Zuo Ci playing tricks on Cao Cao (played by Lai Pak-hoi). It was one of the earliest locally filmed Hong Kong feature films to become successful on a grand scale.

See also
 List of media adaptations of Romance of the Three Kingdoms

References

External links
 

1931 films
1931 comedy-drama films
Hong Kong comedy-drama films
Films set in 3rd-century Han dynasty
Films based on Romance of the Three Kingdoms
Chinese silent films
Chinese comedy-drama films
Chinese black-and-white films
Silent comedy-drama films